Axel Simonsen (11 March 1887 – 3 April 1938) was a Norwegian long distance runner, born in Oslo. He represented the club IK Tjalve. He participated in marathon at the 1912 Summer Olympics in Stockholm.

References

1887 births
1938 deaths
Athletes from Oslo
Norwegian male long-distance runners
Athletes (track and field) at the 1912 Summer Olympics
Olympic athletes of Norway
Norwegian male marathon runners